Kadavu (English: The Ferry Slip) is a 1991 Indian Malayalam film scripted, directed and produced by M. T. Vasudevan Nair based on S. K. Pottekkatt's story Kadathuthoni. The film won numerous awards at state, national and international levels, including awards at the Singapore International Film Festival and Tokyo International Film Festival. Film critic Kozhikodan included the film on his list of the 10 best Malayalam movies of all time.

Synopsis
Deserted by his mother, teenaged Raju is adopted by Beeranikka, a Muslim ferryman. Raju soon starts accompanying Beeranikka in ferrying people. One day, he meets a young girl who is returning to her native town Kozhikode after the death of her mother. The girl invites Raju to Kozhikode where she would be staying with her father and uncle. Not interested in leaving the ferrying job, Raju rejects the invitation. A few days later, he finds himself in possession of an ornament which he thinks belongs to the girl. He travels to Kozhikode to return the ornament and finds the girl after many days of search. The girl says she does not recognise Raju and says the ornament does not belong to her. Disheartened, Raju returns to the ferry.

Cast
 Santhosh Antony as Raju. The lead character Raju was portrayed by Santhosh Antony. A native of Koodaranhi in Kozhikode district, this was Santhosh's only film.
 Balan K. Nair as Beeran
 Monisha as Devi
 Sreedevi Unni as Amina
 Murali as Rahman
 Thilakan as Krishnettan
 Ravi Vallathol as Maash
 Nedumudi Venu as the anchorite
 Jagathy Sreekumar as the hawker
Savithri Sreedharan
 R. K. Nair as the goon
 Kunjandi as Taxi driver
 Bhagya Roopa as the girl
 Biyon as Appu

Awards
 International awards
 Special Jury Award at Singapore International Film Festival
 Asia Future Prize at Tokyo International Film Festival
 National Film Awards
 Best Screenplay
 Best Feature Film in Malayalam
 Kerala State Film Awards
 Best Film
 Best Screenplay
 Best Child Artist - Santhosh Antony

References

External links
 
 Kadavu at the Malayalam Movie Database

1990s Malayalam-language films
Films with screenplays by M. T. Vasudevan Nair
Films whose writer won the Best Original Screenplay National Film Award
Best Malayalam Feature Film National Film Award winners
Films directed by M. T. Vasudevan Nair